Namangunam is a village in the Sendurai taluk of Ariyalur district, Tamil Nadu, India.

Demographics 

As per the 2001 census, Namangunam had a total population of 3446 with 1683 males and 1763 females.

References 

Villages in Ariyalur district